The Otto Bombach House is a contributing structure in the La Villita Historic District of the Bexar County city of San Antonio in the U.S. state of Texas.  The one-and-two-story native limestone structure was built by German immigrant Bombach in the mid-19th century. It was acquired and restored by the San Antonio Conservation Society (SACS), which still owns the property.  Over the decades, SACS has leased the property to a variety of tenants, including the San Antonio Press Club.  Currently, the building houses the Little Rhein Steak House.

References

Houses in San Antonio
German-American culture in Texas
History of San Antonio
National Register of Historic Places in San Antonio
Houses on the National Register of Historic Places in Texas
Historic district contributing properties in Texas